Incheh Salah may refer to:
 Incheh Salah-e Olya
 Incheh Salah-e Sofla